De Spin Ghar Bazan or the Spin Ghar Hawks, is a professional football team in Afghanistan. They play in the Afghan Premier League. It was founded in August 2012 during the creation of Afghan Premier League and its players have been chosen through a casting-show called Maidan-E-Sabz (Green Field). Based in the city of Jalalabad, the club represents the provinces of Nangarhar, Laghman, Kapisa, Kunar and Nuristan in the eastern region of Afghanistan.

In the fourth league season, De Spin Ghar Bazan became champions of the league by defeating Shaheen Asmayee in a penalty shoot-out, 4–3, after extra time.

Continental history

Honours

Domestic
Afghan Premier League
Champions (1): 2015

Invitational
Sheikh Kamal International Club Cup
Semi-finals (1): 2015

References

Football clubs in Afghanistan
Jalalabad
2012 establishments in Afghanistan
Association football clubs established in 2012